La Tour-du-Pin is a subprefecture of the Isère department in the Auvergne-Rhône-Alpes region in Southeastern France. In 2018, the commune had a population of 8,137.

Geography
The Bourbre flows west through the southern part of the commune and crosses the town.

Population and society

Education 
There are three public nursery and elementary schools (École Jean Rostand, École Albert Thevenon, and École Louis Pasteur) and one private nursery and primary school, the École St Joseph.
There are also two public middle schools: the Collège Les Dauphins and the Collège Le Calloud, and one private middle school, the Collège St Bruno, there is one public high school too, the Lycée Élie Cartan, and one technical high school for learning of the horticulture.

Sport 
There is a football club (FCTC), a rugby club (RCVT) and a basket-ball club (BVT).

See also
Communes of the Isère department

References

Communes of Isère
Subprefectures in France
Dauphiné
Isère communes articles needing translation from French Wikipedia